4 Ursae Minoris is a binary star system in the northern circumpolar constellation Ursa Minor. It is faintly visible to the naked eye with an apparent visual magnitude of 4.80. It is moving further away with a heliocentric radial velocity of +5.9 km/s.

This is a single-lined spectroscopic binary star system with an orbital period of 1.66 years and an eccentricity of 0.14. The primary is a red giant of spectral type K3-IIIb Fe-0.5, a star that has used up its core hydrogen and is expanding. The suffix notation indicates the spectrum displays a mild underabundance of iron for a star of its type. It has expanded to around 28 times the Sun's radius and is radiating 437 times the Sun's luminosity from its enlarged photosphere at an effective temperature of 4,165 K.

References

K-type giants
Spectroscopic binaries
Ursa Minor (constellation)
Durchmusterung objects
Ursae Minoris, 04
124547
069112
5321